Mühringen is a district of Horb am Neckar. Mühringen has about 1,000 inhabitants.

There is a railway station of the Hohenzollerische Landesbahn in the valley; Mühringen is a station of a German Camino de Santiago.

History 
The first time Mühringen was mentioned in documents was May 3, 786 C.E.

Mühringen has a Jewish cemetery, which lies in the forest between Mühringen and Eyach.

Maximilian Berlitz, founder of Berlitz Language Schools, was born in Mühringen, Kingdom of Württemberg, April 14, 1852.

References 

Towns in Baden-Württemberg